Shot in the arm can mean:
A Shot in the Arm, a 1999 single by American band Wilco from their album Summerteeth
See bullet wound
A metaphor for a stimulus, as if by hypodermic injection